Effia Nkwanta Regional Hospital is one of the ten regional hospitals of Ghana located in the Western Region. It is a secondary health facility which also receives referrals from the Western corridor of Ghana. It was established in 1938 as military hospital by the Gold Coast government.

References 

Hospitals in Ghana